Bernhard Wessel (20 August 1936 – 25 June 2022) was a German footballer who played as a goalkeeper, most notably for Borussia Dortmund.

Honours
Borussia Dortmund
 German football championship: 1963
 DFB-Pokal: 1965
 European Cup Winners' Cup: 1966

References

External links
 

1936 births
2022 deaths
German footballers
German football managers
Association football goalkeepers
Bundesliga players
Borussia Dortmund players